Pedro de Obregón, (1597–1659) was a Spanish painter and printmaker.

According to art historian Antonio Palomino, Pedro de Obregón was initially taught by Vincenzo Carducci, and became one of his best pupils, imitating the teacher in drawing. Palomino asserts that he painted many pictures for individuals and few to the public, although some notable works include a Holy Trinity for the convent of the Merced Calzada of Madrid, and San Joaquin and Santa Ana, commissioned by the Church of Santa Cruz, also of Madrid. These pieces were lost, but one noted was the Apparition of the Infant Jesus to San Antonio dated 1633, in the convent of Santa Clara in Villacastín.

Documentation shows he also made prints, one of them a Saint Dominic in Soriano made from a drawing by Alonzo Cano, and the other a small work with a woman sitting painting. There is also an etching also attributed to him that was given to Charles II and Mariana of Austria, signed P º Obregon.

He was the father of Diego de Obregón, a writer specializing in book illustration, and Marcos de Obregón, a priest who also practiced engraving but with less success.

References
 Cean Bermudez, John Augustine, Historical Dictionary of the most distinguished teachers of the Fine Arts in Spain, Madrid, 1800, vol. III, p. 246.
 Gallego, Antonio, History of printmaking in Spain, Madrid, Ediciones Chair, 1999, .
 Palomino, Antonio (1988). The pictorial museum optical scale III. The picturesque Spanish Parnassus laureate .. Madrid: Aguilar SA Editions. .
 Pérez Sánchez, Alfonso E. (1992). Baroque Painting in Spain 1600–1750. Madrid: Ediciones Chair. .

1597 births
1659 deaths
17th-century Spanish painters
Spanish male painters
Spanish Baroque painters